Hamid-Reza Haji Babaee (born 14 May 1959) is an Iranian politician who was Minister of Education from 2009 to 2013. He is the current member of the Parliament of Iran from Hamedan since 2016, as he previously held the position from the same district from 1996 until 2009 when he was nominated as Minister of Education by Mahmoud Ahmadinejad and was confirmed by Parliament. Haji Babaee gained a B.A. in 1988 and M.A. in 1993, both in theology, and obtained Ph.D. in 1998.

References

Sources

External links 

People from Hamadan
1959 births
Living people
Education ministers of Iran
YEKTA Front politicians
Moderation and Development Party politicians
Popular Front of Islamic Revolution Forces politicians
Islamic Republican Party politicians
21st-century Iranian politicians